Yevgeny Frolov may refer to:

 Yevgeny Frolov (boxer) (born 1941), Soviet boxer
 Yevgeny Frolov (fencer), Kazakhstani fencer who participated in the 2006 Asian Games
 Yevgeny Frolov (footballer, born 1986), Russian footballer
 Yevgeny Frolov (footballer, born 1988), Russian footballer
 Yevgeny Frolov (footballer, born 1997), Russian footballer
 Yevgeny Frolov (pilot) (born 1951), Russian test pilot, Hero of the Russian Federation